"Night of the Hunter" is a song by American rock band Thirty Seconds to Mars, featured on their third studio album This Is War. Written by lead vocalist Jared Leto, the song was released as the fifth and final single from the album in 2011. The track was produced by Flood, Steve Lillywhite and 30 Seconds to Mars, and was inspired by Jared and his brother Shannon's youth in Louisiana.

Background and recording
The song was written by Jared Leto, with him playing lead guitar, Tomo Milicevic playing the bass guitar, and Shannon Leto on drums. Jared Leto said the following to MTV News:

Lead guitarist Tomo Milicevic said the following about the song to Music Radar:

Music video
In an interview with MTV, Jared Leto said the following about a potential video:

However, he also said the following:

Release
In an interview with MTV, Jared Leto said the following about the release of the song:

The song impacted radio on May 17, 2011. On September 18, 2012, a remix of "Night of the Hunter" by the band's drummer Shannon Leto was released as a digital single. Speaking about the remix, he said: "'Night of the Hunter' is one of my favorite songs to play live with my band and I really wanted to reinvent it, to shed a different light on it by bringing a dance element to it."

Charts

Credits and personnel
Credits adapted from This Is War liner notes.
Performed by 30 Seconds to Mars
Written by Jared Leto
Published by Apocraphex Music (ASCAP)/Universal Music - Z Tunes, LLC (ASCAP)
Produced by Flood, Steve Lillywhite, 30 Seconds to Mars
Recorded by Ryan Williams, Matt Radosevich at The International Centre for the Advancement of the Arts and Sciences of Sound, Los Angeles, CA
Additional engineering by Tom Biller, Rob Kirwan, Jamie Schefman, Sonny Diperri
Mixed by Ryan Williams at Pulse Recording Studios, Los Angeles, CA
Additional strings orchestrated and recorded by Michael Einziger at Harvard University, Cambridge, MA
Mastered by Stephen Marcussen at Marcussen Mastering, Hollywood, CA

References

Thirty Seconds to Mars songs
2011 singles
Songs written by Jared Leto
Industrial rock songs
2009 songs
Song recordings produced by Flood (producer)
Song recordings produced by Steve Lillywhite
Virgin Records singles
EMI Records singles